PCRD may refer to:

 Pacific Century Regional Developments Limited, a Singapore-based company
 "Programme cadre de recherche et de développement", the French-language expression for the European Union Framework Programmes for Research and Technological Development